Roman Smieška (born 18 December 1986) is a former Slovak footballer who currently plays for  ŠKM Liptovský Hrádok. His former club was a club MFK Ružomberok. He is also current fashion model.

Smieska was born in Ružomberok, Czechoslovakia, and started his career 1997 with MFK Ružomberok  and played until summer 2012 for the club.

Personal life 
He works besides his football career as Fashion model in Slovakia.

References

1986 births
Living people
Slovak footballers
Association football goalkeepers
MFK Ružomberok players
Slovak Super Liga players
Sportspeople from Ružomberok